Joseph Douglas Kowal (born February 3, 1956) is a Canadian former professional ice hockey left wing who played 22 games in the National Hockey League with the Buffalo Sabres between 1976 and 1978. The rest of his career, which lasted from 1976 to 1981, was spent in the minor American Hockey League. He was drafted in the second round, 33rd overall, by the Sabres in the 1976 NHL Amateur Draft.

Career statistics

Regular season and playoffs

External links
 

1956 births
Living people
Binghamton Dusters players
Buffalo Sabres draft picks
Buffalo Sabres players
Canadian ice hockey left wingers
Hamilton Fincups players
Hershey Bears players
Indianapolis Racers draft picks
Nova Scotia Voyageurs players
Oshawa Generals players
Rochester Americans players
Ice hockey people from Toronto
Springfield Indians players